The 2018 season of Borneo Football Club.

Players

Current squad

Out on loan

References

External links
 

Borneo
Borneo F.C.